Exoletuncus multimaculatus is a species of moth of the family Tortricidae. It is endemic to Ecuador (Carchi Province).

The ground colour of the forewings is white with black markings. The hindwings are creamy white, tinged with brownish beyond the middle and spotted brownish creamy.

References

External links

Moths described in 2002
Endemic fauna of Ecuador
Euliini
Moths of South America
Taxa named by Józef Razowski